Niš  (names in other languages) or historically Nish or Nissa is the third largest city in Serbia and the administrative center of the Nišava District. It is located in southern part of Serbia. , the city proper has a population of 183,164, while its administrative area (City of Niš) has a population of 260,237 inhabitants.

Several Roman emperors were born in Niš or used it as a residence: Constantine the Great, the first Christian emperor and the founder of Constantinople, Constantius III, Constans, Vetranio, Julian, Valentinian I, Valens; and Justin I. Emperor Claudius Gothicus decisively defeated the Goths at the Battle of Naissus (present-day Niš). Later playing a prominent role in the history of the Byzantine Empire, the city's past would earn it the nickname Imperial City.

After about 400 years of Ottoman rule, the city was liberated in 1878 and became part of the Principality of Serbia, though not without great bloodshed—remnants of which can be found throughout the city. Today, Niš is one of the most important economic centers in Serbia, especially in the electronics, mechanical engineering, textile, and tobacco industries. Constantine the Great Airport is Niš's international airport. The city is also the seat of the University of Niš, the Eparchy of Niš and the Command of Serbian Army.

In 2013, the city was host to the celebration of 1700 years of Constantine's Edict of Milan.

Name
The town was named after the Nišava River, which flows through the city. It was first named Navissos by Celtic tribes in the 3rd century BC. From this term comes the Latin Naissus, the Greek Nysos and the Slavic Niš. Other variations include: Νάϊσσος, Ναϊσσός (Naissos), Naessus, urbs Naisitana, Navissus, Navissum, Ναϊσσούπολις (Naissoupolis). In Old Serbian, the town was known as Niš (written Нишь and Ньшь). The name is historically rendered as Nish or Nissa in English.

Niš evolved from the toponym attested in Ancient Greek as ΝΑΙΣΣΟΣ (Naissos), which achieved its present form via phonetic changes in Proto-Albanian and thereafter the placename entered Slavic. Nish might indicate that Proto-Albanian was spoken in the region in pre-Slavic antiquity. Per Eric P. Hamp the name of Niš is clearly Albanian in shape. According to Ismajli (2015), when this settlement happened is a matter of debate, as Proto-Albanians might have moved relatively late in antiquity in the area which might have been an eastern expansion of Proto-Albanian settlement as no other toponyms known in antiquity in the area presuppose an Albanian development. The development of Nish < Naiss- may also represent a regional development in late antiquity Balkans which while related may not be identical with Albanian.

History

Early history

Niš may have been first founded as a Celtic settlement in the pre-Roman era. There is very little archaeological evidence however which can be used to reconstruct a pre-Roman history of Niš . The city became known in the Roman as one large urban centers of the central Balkans. During the Roman conquest of the Balkans between 168 and 75 BC, the city, known as Naissus in Latin, was used as a base of operations. Naissus was first mentioned in Roman documents near the beginning of the 2nd century CE, and was considered a place worthy of note in the Geography of Ptolemy of Alexandria.

The Romans occupied the town during the Dardanian campaign (75–73 BC), and set up a legionary camp in the city. The city, called refugia and vici in pre-Roman relation, as a result of its strategic position (the Thracians were based to the south) developed as an important garrison and market town in the province of Moesia Superior. In 272 AD, the future Emperor Constantine the Great was born in Naissus. Constantine created the Dacia Mediterranea province, of which Naissus was the capital, which also included Remesiana on the Via Militaris and the towns of Pautalia and Germania. He lived in Naissus briefly from 316 to 322.

The city was of great importance for the Constantinian dynasty. It is the birthplace of Constantine the Great who turned it from a middle-sized town to a large city with many public buildings. The city flourished greatly in the Constantinian period. A bronze bust of Constantine decorated city. It was his temporary residence and the city where he promulgated many laws, preserved in the Theodosian code. In Constantinian narratives, Naissus was the city where the usurper Vetranio abdicated to Constantius II after a powerful speech he gave to the rebel armies. Julian, the last Constantinian emperor, used Naissus, which had arms factories, as his base in the civil war and recruited Illyrians and others as soldiers for his campaign.

In 364 AD, the imperial Villa Mediana  was the site where emperors Valentinian and Valens met and divided the Roman Empire into halves which they would rule as co-emperors.

It was besieged by the Huns in 441 and devastated in 448, and again in 480 when the partially-rebuilt town was demolished by the Barbarians. Byzantine Emperor Justinian I restored the town but it was destroyed by the Avars once again. The Slavs, in their campaign against Byzantium, conquered Niš and settled here in 540.

Middle Ages

In 805, the town and its surroundings were taken by Bulgarian Emperor Krum. In the 11th century Byzantium reclaimed control over Naissus and the surrounding area.

King Solomon of Hungary and Prince Géza marched along the valley of the river Great Morava as far as Niš. The Hungarians seized the Byzantine city without any resistance in 1072. During the People's Crusade, on 3 July 1096, Peter the Hermit clashed with Byzantine forces at Naissus. Manuel I fortified the town, but under his successor Andronikos I it was seized by the Hungarian king Béla III. Byzantine control was eventually reestablished, but in 1185 it fell under Serbian control. By 1188, Niš became the capital of Serbian king Stefan Nemanja. On 27 July 1189, Nemanja received German emperor Frederick Barbarossa and his 100,000 crusaders at Niš. Niš is mentioned in descriptions of Serbia under Vukan in 1202, highlighting its special status. In 1203, Kaloyan of Bulgaria annexed Niš. Stefan Nemanjić later regained the region.

Ottoman period
The fall of the Serbian Empire, which was conquered by Ottoman Sultan Murad I in 1385, decided the fate of Niš as well. After a 25-day-long siege the city fell to the Ottomans. It was returned to Serbian rule in 1443. Niš again fell under Ottoman rule in 1448, and remained thusly for 241 years. During Ottoman rule Niš was a seat of the empire's military and civil administration. A Silesian traveler stated in 1596 that the route from Sofia to Niš was littered with corpses and described the gates of Niš as bedecked with the freshly-severed heads of poor Bulgarian peasants. In 1689, Niš was seized by the Austrian army during the Great Turkish War, but the Ottomans regained it in 1690. In 1737, Niš was again seized by the Austrians, who attempted to rebuild the fortifications around the city. The same year, the Ottomans reclaimed the city without resistance.

During the First Serbian uprising in 1809, Serbian revolutionaries attempted to liberate Niš in the Battle of Čegar. After the defeat of the Serbian forces, the Ottoman commander of Niš ordered the heads of the slain Serbs mounted on a tower to serve as a warning. The structure became known as Skull Tower. In 1821, the Ottomans arrested the Bishop of Niš, Milentija, as well as 200 Serbian patriots, on charges of preparing an uprising in the Niš area in support of the Greek War of Independence. On June 13 of that year, Bishop Milentija and other Serbian leaders were hanged in public.

In the 19th century Niš was an important town, but populated by Bulgarians in the 19th century, when the Niš rebellion broke out in 1841. According to Ottoman statistics during the Tanzimat the population of Sanjak of Niš was treated as Bulgarian, and according to French travelers such as Jérôme-Adolphe Blanqui and Ami Boue in 1837/1841. According to all authors between 1840-72 the delineation between Bulgarians and Serbs is undisputed and ran north of Nis, although one author Cyprien Robert claims that half of the population of the town was made up by Serbians. Serbian cartographers of the time (such as Dimitrije Davidović in 1828 and Milan Savić in 1878) also accepted South Morava river as such delineation and added Niš outside the borders of the Serbian people. The urban population of Niš consisted of 17,107 Christian and 4,291 Muslim males, with total number of 3,500 Serbian houses and 2,000 Muslim houses. Muslim population of Niš consisted mainly of Turks, of which a part were of Albanian origin, and the rest were Muslim Albanians and Muslim Romani.

In 1870, Niš was included in the Bulgarian Exarchate. Before the area had been under the Ecumenical Patriarchate of Constantinople and the Serbian Patriarchate of Peć. The city was also stipulated the area to be ceded to Bulgaria according to the Constantinople Conference in 1876. Niš was finally liberated during the Serbo–Ottoman War of 1876–1878. The battle for the liberation of Niš started on December 29, 1877, and the Serbian Army entered Niš on January 11, 1878, and it became a part of Serbia. The Albanian quarter was burned and some of the town's Muslim population fled to the Ottoman vilayet of Kosovo, resettling in Pristina, while others went to Skopje. The number of remaining Muslims counted were 1,168, with many being Muslim Romani, out of the pre-war ca. 8,500. The demographics of Niš underwent change whereby Serbs who formed half the urban population prior to 1878 became 80 percent in 1884.

Independent Serbia
In the following years, the city saw rapid development. The city library was founded in 1879 and the famous Serbian writer Stevan Sremac, a native of Niš, was its first clerk. The first hotel, Europe, was built in 1879; shortly after the first district hospital and the first bank started operating in 1881. In 1878, the first Grammar School (Gimnazija), in 1882 the Teacher Training College, and in 1894, the Girls' College were founded in Niš. The City Hall was built from 1882 to 1887.

In 1883, Kosta Čendaš established the first printing house. In 1884, the first newspaper in the city Niški Vesnik was started. In 1884, Jovan Apel built a brewery. A railway line to Niš was built in 1884, as well as the city's railway station; on August 8, 1884, the first train arrived from Belgrade. In 1885, Niš became the last station of the Orient Express, until the railroad was built between Niš and Sofia in 1888. In 1887, the Niš Theatre Sinđelić was built.

In 1897 Mita Ristić founded the Nitex textile factory. In 1905 the female painter Nadežda Petrović established the Sićevo art colony. The first film was screened in 1897, and the first permanent cinema started operating in 1906. The hydroelectric dam in Sićevo Gorge on the Nišava was built in 1908; at the time, it was the largest in Serbia. The airfield was built in 1912 on the Trupale field, and the first aeroplane arrived on December 29, 1912. The city's museum was founded in 1913.

During the First Balkan War, Niš was the seat of The Main Headquarters of the Serbian Army, which led military operations against the Ottoman Empire. In World War I, Niš was the wartime capital of Serbia, hosting the Government and the National Assembly, until Central Powers conquered Serbia in November 1915, when the city was ceded to Bulgaria. After the breakthrough of the Salonika front, the First Serbian Army commanded by general Petar Bojović liberated Niš on October 12, 1918.

During the age and breakup of Yugoslavia

In the first few years after the war, Niš was recovering from the damage. In 1921, Niš became the centre of the Region (oblast), governed by a grand-župan, appointed by royal decree. From 1929 to 1941, Niš was the capital of the Morava Banovina of the Kingdom of Yugoslavia. The tram system in Niš started to run in November 1930. The national airline Aeroput included Niš as a regular destination for the route Belgrade—Niš—Skopje—Thessaloniki in 1930. During the time of German occupation in World War II, the first Nazi Crveni Krst concentration camp in Yugoslavia was in Niš. About 30,000 people passed through this camp, of whom over 10,000 were shot on nearby Bubanj hill. On February 12, 1942, 147 prisoners staged a mass escape. In 1944, the city was heavily bombed by the Allies.

On October 14, 1944, after a long and exhausting battle, the 7th German SS Division 'Prinz Eugen' was defeated and Niš was liberated by Bulgarian Army, and Partisans. The city was also the site of a unique and accidental friendly fire air war on November 7, 1944 between the air forces of the United States and Soviet Union. On June 23, 1948, Niš was the site of a catastrophic flood during which the Nišava river's water level raised by an unprecedented 5.5 meters.

After World War II, the University of Niš was founded on June 15, 1965.

Over the course of the 1999 NATO bombing of Yugoslavia, Niš was subject to airstrikes on 40 occasions. On May 7, 1999, the city was the site of a NATO cluster bomb raid which killed up to 16 civilians. By the end of the NATO bombing campaign, a total of 56 people in Niš had been killed from airstrikes.

2000–present
In April 2012, the Russian-Serbian Humanitarian Center was established in the city of Niš. In December 2017, a new building of Clinical Centre of Niš spreading over 45,000 square meters was opened.

Geography
The road running from the North, from Western and Central Europe and Belgrade down to the Morava River valley, forks into two major lines at Niš: the southern line, leading to Thessalonica and Athens, and the eastern one leading towards Sofia and Istanbul.

Niš is situated at the 43°19' latitude north and 21°54' longitude east, in the Nišava valley, near the spot where it joins the South Morava. The highest point in the city area is "Sokolov kamen" (Falcon's rock) on the Suva Planina (Dry Mountain) while the lowest spot is at Trupale, near the mouth of the Nišava. Below Niska Banja and Nis, under the ground is a natural source of hot water, unique potential of clean and renewable geothermal energy at the surface of up to 65 square kilometers. The natural reservoir is at a depth of 500 to 800 meters, and the estimated capacity is about 400 million cubic meters of thermal mineral water.

Climate
Niš has a humid subtropical climate, but with continental influences. The average barometer value is 992.74 mb. On average, there are 134 days with rain and snow cover lasts for 41 days.

Demographics

According to the final results from the 2011 census, the population of city proper of Niš was 183,164, while its administrative area had a population of 260,237. 

The city of Niš has 87,975 households with 2,96 members on average, while the number of homes is 119,196.

Religion structure in the city of Niš is predominantly Serbian Orthodox (240,765), with minorities like Muslims (2,486), Catholics (809), Protestants (258), Atheists (109) and others. Most of the population speaks Serbian language (249,949).

The composition of population by sex and average age:
 Male – 126,645 (40.90 years) and
 Female – 133,592 (42.81 years).

A total of 120,562 citizens (older than 15 years) have secondary education (53.81%), while the 51,471 citizens have higher education (23.0%). Of those with higher education, 34,409 (15.4%) have university education.

Ethnic composition
The ethnic composition of the city of Niš:

Administrative divisions

Economy
The city of Niš is the administrative, industrial, commercial, financial and cultural center of the south-eastern part of Republic of Serbia. The position of Niš is strategically important, at the intersection of European highway and railway networks connecting Europe with Asia. Niš is easily accessible, having an airport – Niš Constantine the Great Airport and being a point of intersection of numerous railroad and highway lines.

It is in Niš that the trunk road running from the north down the Morava River valley forks into two major lines:

 the south one, leading to Thessalonica and Athens, along the Vardar River valley,
 and the east one, running along the Nišava and the Marica, leading towards Sofia and Istanbul, and further on, towards the Near East.

These roads have been widely known from ancient times, because they represented the beaten tracks along which peoples, goods and armies moved. Known as 'Via Militaris' in Roman and Byzantine periods, or 'Constantinople road' in Middle Ages, these roads still represent major European traffic arteries. Niš thus stands at a point of intersection of the roads connecting Asia Minor to Europe, and the Black Sea to the Mediterranean. Nis had been a relatively developed city in the former Yugoslavia. In 1981, its GDP per capita was 110% of the Yugoslav average.

As of September 2017, Niš has one of 14 free economic zones established in Serbia.

Economic preview

The following table gives a preview of total number of registered people employed in legal entities per their core activity (as of 2019):

Companies

Niš is one of the most important industrial centers in Serbia, well known for its tobacco, electronics, construction, mechanical-engineering, textile, nonferrous-metal, food-processing and rubber-goods industries.

Among the manufacturing companies which had a huge impact during the second half of the 20th century on Niš's development are: EI Niš (electronics industry), Mechanical Industry Niš, "Građevinar" (construction company), Niš Tobacco Factory, "Nitex – Niš" (textile industry), "Niš Brewery" (beverages) and "Žitopek" (bakery). Other prominent companies which went bankrupt during the 1990s and 2000s are: "Vulkan" (rubber-goods manufacturer), "NISSAL" (nonferrous-metal industry).

Prominent tobacco manufacturer "Niš Tobacco Factory" was sold to Philip Morris in August 2003 for 518 million euros, while Nitex was sold to Benetton Group. In recent years, Integrated Micro-Electronics, Inc., Yura Corporation, Zumtobel Group, Johnson Electric and Shinwon opened their plants in Niš. Currently, Chinese manufacturer, Xingyu automotive systems, is building its factory.

In former Electronic and Mechanical Industry complexes, many smaller manufacturers opened their plants.

In 2019, companies with highest operating income were Philip Morris International, with over 190,000,000 Euros and Johnson Electric with over 140,000,000 Euros.

Transportation
Niš is strategically between the Morava river valley in North and the Vardar river valley in the south, on the main route between Greece and Central Europe. In the Niš area, this major transportation and communication route is linked with the natural corridor formed by the Nišava river valley, which runs Eastwards in the direction of Sofia and Istanbul. The city has been a passing station for the Orient Express.

The first highways date back to the 1950s when Niš was linked with capital Belgrade through the Brotherhood and Unity Highway, the first in Southeastern Europe.

Historically, because of its location, the city had always great importance in the region. The first to take advantage of it was the Roman Empire that built the important road Via Militaris, linking the city with Singidunum (current Belgrade) to the North and Constantinople (current Istanbul) to the southeast. Nowadays, the city is connected by the highway E75 with Belgrade and Central Europe in north, and Skopje, Thessaloniki and Athens in the south. The road E80 connects Niš with Sofia, Istanbul towards the Middle East, and Pristina, Montenegro and the Adriatic Sea to the West. The road E771 connects the city with Zaječar, Kladovo and Drobeta-Turnu Severin in Romania.

The city is also a major regional railway junction linking Serbia to Sofia and Istanbul.

The Niš Constantine the Great Airport is the second most important airport in Serbia. The first airfield serving the city of Niš was established in 1910, near the village of Donje Međurovo. In the 1930s then-national airline company Aeroput used the airport for civil service. In 1935 Aeroput included a stop in Niš in its route linking Belgrade with Skoplje.

The city public transportation consists nowadays of 13 bus lines. A tram system existed in Niš between 1930 and 1958. Niš Bus Station is the city's largest and main bus station which offers both local urban and intercity transport to international destinations. The largest intercity bus carrier based in the city is Niš-Ekspres, which operates to various cities and villages in Serbia, Montenegro, and Bosnia and Herzegovina.

Culture

Theatre

Niš is a home of the National Theatre in Niš, that was founded as "Sinđelić" Theatre in 1889.

Music
From 1981 Niš is the host of Nišville International Jazz music festival which begins in mid-August and lasts for 4 days. Galija, Kerber and Eyot are considered the most notable music bands to have originated from Niš. Other notable Niš music acts include Daltoni, Dobri Isak, Lutajuća Srca, Mama Rock, Hazari, Novembar, Trivalia and others.

Tourism

Tourist sites

Čegar – The place where the Battle of Čegar took place on May 19, 1809.
Crveni Krst concentration camp – One of the few preserved Nazi concentration camps in Europe. It is on February 12 Boulevard.
Memorial to Constantine the Great – built in the city centre in 2013, in commemoration to Constantine the Great who was born in the city, on the anniversary of the Edict of Milan.
Bubanj – Monument to fallen Yugoslav World War II fighters, forming the shape of three clenched fists. The place where 10,000 civilian hostages from Niš and south Serbia were brutally murdered by German Nazis.
Kalča, City passage and Gorča – Trade centers situated in Milana Obrenovića Street.
Memorial Chapel in the memory of NATO bombing victims – The chapel was built by local authorities while the monument was built by the State government in 1999. They are situated in Sumatovacka street near Niš Fortress.
Niš Fortress – The remaining fortification was built by the Turks, and dates from the first decades of the 18th century (1719–23). It is situated in the city center.
The fortress-cafes – They are situated near Stambol gate (the main gate of the fortress).
Mediana – Archeological site, an Imperial villa, from the late Roman period on the road leading to Sofia, Bulgaria, near EI Nis.
Niška Banja (Niš spa) – A very popular spa during the summer season.
Tinkers Alley – An old urban downtown zone in today's Kopitareva Street, built in the first half of the 18th century. It was a street full of tinkers and other craftsmen, but today it is packed with cafes and restaurants.
Skull Tower (Ćele Kula) – A monument to the Serbian revolutionaries (1804–13); a tower made out of skulls of Serbian uprisers, killed and decapitated by the Ottomans. It is situated on Zoran Đinđić Boulevard, on the old Constantinople road leading to Sofia.
Sultans Trail Long distance hiking and biking route from Vienna to İstanbul runs through Niš.

Architecture and monuments
Buildings in Niš are constantly being built. Niš is the second city in Serbia after Belgrade by number of high-rises. The Ambassador Hotel is one of the tallest buildings in Niš, but there are also other buildings like TV5 Tower.

Sport

The city of Niš is home to numerous sport clubs including Radnički Niš, RK Železničar 1949, Mašinac, ŽRK Naisa, OK Niš, Mašinac, Sinđelić Niš etc.

The biggest stadium in Niš is the Stadion Čair, with a total seating-capacity of 18,151 after renovations. The stadium is part of the Čair Sports Complex that also includes an indoor swimming pool and an indoor arena. Niš was one of four towns which hosting the 2012 European Men's Handball Championship.

Notable residents
The people listed below were born in, residents of, or otherwise closely associated with the city of Niš, and its surrounding metropolitan area.

 Constantius I, Roman Emperor, father of Constantine I
 Constantine I, the great, (Flavius Valerius Aurelius Constantinus) – ruled 306 to 337
 Constantius III, (Flavius Constantius) – ruled 421
 Justin I, (Flavius Iustinus) – ruled 518 to 527
 Nikephoros Lykaon protospatharios c. 1050
 Stevan Sinđelić, war leader (vojvoda), died in 1809 in the Battle of Čegar.
 Stevan Sremac (1855–1906), writer, came to Niš shortly after its liberation from the Turkish rule; wrote about life in old Niš (Ivkova slava, Zona Zamfirova).
 Nikola Uzunović, (b. 1873), prime minister of Kingdom of Yugoslavia from 1926 to 1927.
 Dragiša Cvetković, (1893–1969), prime minister of Kingdom of Yugoslavia from 1939 to 1941.
Svetislav Milosavljević, (1882–1960), a Yugoslav army general and first Ban of Vrbas Banovina.
 Dušan Radović, (1922–84), journalist and writer.
Dušan Čkrebić, (b. 1927), President(1984–1986) and Prime Minister(1978–1982) of SR Serbia.
Spiridon, (?–1389), Patriarch of Serbian Patriarchate of Peć.
Irinej (1930–2020), Serbian patriarch (2010–2020) and Bishop of Niš (1975–2010)
 Nadja Regin, (1931–2019), Serbian and British actress.
 Predrag Antonijević, (b. 1959), film director.
 Branko Miljković (1934–61), poet.
 Bratislav Anastasijević (1936–1992), musician, conductor
 Šaban Bajramović (1936–2008), Romani singer and composer.
 Kornelije Kovač (b. 1942), rock musician and composer.
 Goran Paskaljević (1947–2020), movie director; raised by his grandparents in Niš 1949–63, after the divorce of his parents.
 Dragan Pantelić (b. 1951), former football goalkeeper, president of Radnički Niš.
 Eva Haljecka Petković (1870–1947), doctor.
 Predrag Miletić (b. 1952), actor.
Miki Manojlović (b. 1950), actor.
 Zoran Živković (b. 1954), handball player and coach, Olympic champion
 Aki Rahimovski (b. 1954), rock musician.
 Nenad Milosavljević (b. 1954), rock musician.
 Biljana Krstić (b. 1959), rock and traditional music singer and songwriter.
 Ana Stanić (b.1975), Serbian pop-rock singer
 Zoran Živković (b. 1960), politician, a former Prime Minister of Serbia.
 Zoran Ćirić (b. 1962), writer.
 Aleksandar Šoštar (b. 1964), water polo goalkeeper, Olympic, World and European champion.
 Dragan Stojković (b. 1965), football player, Olympic bronze medalist. 
 Lidija Mihajlović (b. 1968), shooting champion.
 Branislava Ilić (b. 1970), playwright, screenwriter, prose writer, essayist.
 Ivan Miljković (b. 1979), volleyball player, Olympic and European champion.
 Bojana Popović (b. 1979), Montenegrin handball player, Olympic silver medalist.
 Nikola Karabatić (b. 1984), French handball player, Olympic, World and European champion.
 Nemanja Radulović (b. 1985), violinist.
 Ivan Kostic (b. 1989), footballer.
 Stefan Jović (b. 1990), basketball player, Olympic, World Cup, and EuroBasket silver medalist.
 Sava Ranđelović (b. 1993), water polo player, Olympic, World and European champion.
 Andrija Živković (b. 1996), footballer, U-20 World champion.
 Staša Gejo (b. 1997), sport climber, World and European champion.
 Nemanja Radonjić (b. 1996), footballer, Serbian champion.

Diplomatic missions 
The city of Niš, after Belgrade, has the largest diplomatic corps in Serbia. Bulgaria has General Consulate in Niš. Until 2010, there was also a Consulate General of Greece. Diplomatic agreements were given to five prominent citizens of Niš, who acquired the title of honorary consul. The United Kingdom, Hungary, France, Slovakia and Austria have chosen Nis as their honorary consuls, appreciating their commitment and contribution to strengthening ties and cooperation in various fields with these countries.

General Consulates:

 Bulgaria

 Turkey (to be opened)

Honorary Consulates:

Local media

Online newspaper
Narodne novine "Народне новине" 
Južne vesti (Southern news) 

Online radio stations
Internet.Radio.Magazin Super radio 
Radio stations
Baltazar radio (90.5) (renamed to Radio Jat (90.5))
Banker radio (98.3)
City radio (99.9) 
Radio Nišava (104.0) (in Romany)
Radio Belle Amie (95.6)
Radio Belle Amie Folk Kanal (98.7/100.7) (closed)
Radio Seven (88.8)

TV stations
Banker TV
TV 5 (closed)
BelleAmie TV
TV Nais
RTV Nišava (in Romany)
Čair (in Romany) (closed)
NTV Media Niš
Art TV 
Puls TV (closed)
Kopernikus Televizija

International relations

Twin towns – sister cities
Niš is twinned with the following cities, according to their City Hall website:

Other forms of cooperation and city friendship

See also
 Islam-aga's Mosque

References

Bibliography

External links

 
 Regional Chamber of Economy Niš official website

 
Municipalities and cities of Southern and Eastern Serbia
Populated places in Nišava District
Illyrian Serbia
Cities in ancient Illyria
Roman towns and cities in Serbia
Former capitals of Serbia
Dacia Mediterranea